Dr. T. Vasudeva Reddy (21.Dec.1943 - 26.Aug.2020), from Tirupati, Andhra Pradesh, was a poet, novelist and critic in English. He authored 12 collections of poems, two novels and three critical works. His poems appeared in journals in India and abroad. He was Hon.President of GIEWEC (Guild of Indian English Writers Editors and Critics).

List of works

Poetry collections
 The Rural Muse:The Poetry of T.Vasudeva Reddy (2014), ed.by K. V. Raghupathi, Authors Press, New Delhi, India 
 Golden Veil (2016), Authors Press, New Delhi, India
 Thousand Haiku Pearls (2016), Authors Press, New Delhi, India

Novels
 The Vultures (1983), Calcutta, India
 Minor Gods  (2008), New York City, United States

Criticism
 Jane Austen: The Dialectics of Self-Actualization in her Novels (1987), Sterling, New Delhi, India 	
 Jane Austen: The Matrix of Matrimony  (1987),  Bohra Publication, Jaipur, India
 A Critical Survey of Indo-English Poetry (2016), Authors Press, New Delhi, India

Awards and honours  
In recognition of his achievements Professor Reddy has received several prestigious awards and honours, among them:
‘The International Eminent Poet’ in 1987;
Hon. D.Litt. from the WORLD ACADEMY OF ARTS AND CULTURESan Francisco, United States in 1988;
Best Teacher Award (Univ.& College Level) from the Govt. of Andhra Pradesh, India, in 1990;
Best poetry Award for his third book The Fleeting Bubbles from  Michael Madhusudan Academy, Kolkata in 1994;
UGC (University Grants Commission) Award of National Fellowship (as Visiting Prof.) in 1998;
Award of ‘Excellence in World Poetry’ for the year 2009;

References 

1943 births
Living people
Indian male poets
English-language poets from India
Poets from Andhra Pradesh
English literature academics